Kick Start is a best of album by English power pop band The Lambrettas. It contains the band's three UK chart singles "Poison Ivy", "Da-a-ance", and "Another Day (Another Girl)" (a.k.a. "Page Three"). It also contains several singles that had not been hits and had never been collected on an album before, including the band's first ever single ("Go Steady"), and their last ("Somebody to Love").

Track listing 

 "Go Steady"
 "Poison Ivy"
 "Da-a-a-ance"
 "Can't You Feel the Beat"
 "Another Day (Another Girl)"
 "Steppin Out of Line"
 "Good Times"
 "Lamba Samba"
 "Anything You Want"
 "Decent Town"
 "Somebody to Love"
 "Nobody's Watching Me"

1985 compilation albums
The Lambrettas albums
Albums produced by Peter Collins (record producer)